St Anne's Cathedral or St. Ann’s Cathedral may refer to:

India
 Cathedral of St. Anne, Nasik
 St. Anne Cathedral, Simdega
 St. Anne's Co-Cathedral, Visakhapatnam

Ivory Coast
 St. Ann Cathedral, Gagnoa

United Kingdom
 St Anne's Cathedral, Leeds
 St Anne's Cathedral, Belfast

United States
St. Ann's Cathedral (Great Falls, Montana)
St. Ann's Armenian Catholic Cathedral, New York, New York

See also
Church of St. Ann